Arno Kompatscher (born 19 March 1971) is an Italian politician and governor of South Tyrol. From 15 June 2016 to 7 July 2021 he also was president of the region of Trentino-Alto Adige/Südtirol.

Biography
Kompatscher was born in Völs am Schlern, South Tyrol. After compulsory military service in the Italian Army Alpini corps, he studied law at the University of Innsbruck and the University of Padua. In 2000 he was elected deputy-mayor of his home town and in 2005 he was elected mayor. In 2010 he was once more elected mayor.

In spring 2013 he won the South Tyrolean People's Party (SVP) primary election, becoming the lead candidate for the 2013 provincial elections. The provincial elections on 27 October 2013 were won by the SVP which received 131,236 votes (45.7%). Kompatscher received the most preference votes of all candidates elected to the provincial legislature, namely 81,107 from the SVP voters. He was re-elected in 2019.

References

External links
 Personal website (in German)

Governors of South Tyrol
Germanophone Italian people
Living people
1971 births
South Tyrolean People's Party politicians
Members of the Landtag of South Tyrol
Members of the Regional Council of Trentino-Alto Adige
People from Völs am Schlern